Ingenika Airport  is the old airfield of the Tsay Keh Dene First Nation, located near Ingenika Point at the head of Williston Lake in northern British Columbia. Tsay Keh Airport is the primary air strip for the community, but Ingenika Airport is maintained as an alternative.

References

Registered aerodromes in British Columbia
Peace River Regional District